Elmira Sergeyevna Zherzdeva (born 6 March 1936) is a Soviet singer and Meritorious Artist (since 1992).

Early life and career 
Zherzdeva was born in Bolokhovo, Soviet Union. After finishing school, she entered the music academy at the Moscow Conservatory. In 1958, she worked at an opera choir on the Vsesoyuznoye Radio (All-Union Radio), and then in the philharmonic department Mosconcert as a vocalist. In 1962, she started to work in the variety department of Mosconcert. She was well known for singing old romance classics throughout the nation. Her one and only notable voice acting role was the role of the princess in The Bremen Town Musicians and On the Trail of the Bremen Town Musicians. Her lesser known repertoire consists of Property of the Republic.

External links 
 Elmira Zherzdeva

1936 births
Living people
People from Kireyevsky District
Soviet women singers
Soviet voice actresses
Russian voice actresses
Moscow Conservatory alumni
20th-century Russian women singers
20th-century Russian singers